Hödl is a surname. Notable people with this surname include:

 Helmut Hödl (born 1968), Austrian clarinetist and composer
 Marco Hödl (born 1997), Austrian football player